Chakra was a South Korean girl group that debuted in 2000 with four members: Hwangbo, Eun, Ryeowon, and Eani. Following the release of their first album, the group won Best New Artist at several major South Korean music awards.

After Eani left the group in 2001, the group introduced new member Bona in 2002. Chakra ultimately released three more albums and disbanded in 2006.

History

2000: Debut and popularity gain 
Chakra officially debuted on February 26, 2000 at Music Camp with their first single Han, immediately calling attention, due to its Indian music concept. In March of the year the group released their first solo album titled "Come A Come" with singles titled Come A Come, Hey You and Sign of Love. The album was a success and sold +162,251 copies that led them to win many rookie awards in South Korea, including the SBS Music Awards, the Golden Disk Awards and the Mnet Asian Music Awards. That same year, Chakra released their special Christmas album entitled "Ringing Jingle Bells" with the main ballad single "Lonely Christmas".

2001-2003: Peak, increase in popularity and line-up changes 
In 2001, the group reached its peak when they released their second album "Chakra'Ca", along with the main single "End". It became their first #1 album in South Korea. The main theme focused on African music as the main concept of the album. The album sold +86,635 copies and won in the category of Best Singer dressed at the SBS Music Awards. The other success of this album was "Oh My Boy". At the time it was already very difficult to finance the group, due to a scam that happened to a new company called "Kiss Entertainment". In this process, Eani decided to leave the group at the end of 2001. They introduced a new member, Bona, in 2002.

In 2002 they released their third album "Chakra" with the lead single "Come Back".

In 2003, they released their last album, "Tomato" along with the first single From Me To You, which was a success. The album sold 23,450 copies and at the end of the year, Chakra won again in the Best Dance category at the SBS Music Awards, from this album there are other famous songs like "True Love In This World Is A Live" and the ballad "Why Im The Only One".

2004-2006: Line-up changes and disbandment 
After the end of the promotions of the last album in 2004, Ryeo-won left Chakra to continue her career as an actress.  

In 2005, it was planned to release a new album and do new activities, but the album could not be released due to the company's financial difficulties. Chakra members also suffered a lot of difficulties at this time, and the audience was almost indifferent to the actions of this Chakra trio; this caused Eun to leave the group. At the time, only HwangBo and Bona remained as members of Chakra.

In 2006, Chakra disbanded.

Former Members 
Hwangbo: Leader, Main Rapper, Main Vocalist, Face of the Group (1999-2006)
Bona: Main Vocalist (2001-2006)
Ryeowon: Main Dancer, Vocalist, Center (2000-2004)
Eun: Maknae, Lead Rapper, Vocalist (2000-2005)
Eani: Leader, Lead Dancer, Lead Rapper, Vocalist, Visual (1999-2001)

Discography

Studio albums

Awards

References 

K-pop music groups
Musical groups disestablished in 2006
Musical groups established in 1999
South Korean girl groups
1999 establishments in South Korea
2006 disestablishments in South Korea
MAMA Award winners
Musical quintets